Microbulbifer elongatus is a Gram-negative marine bacterium.

External links
Type strain of Microbulbifer elongatus at BacDive -  the Bacterial Diversity Metadatabase

Alteromonadales
Bacteria described in 1946